The Learjet 60 is a mid-size cabin, medium-range business jet aircraft manufactured by Bombardier Aerospace in Wichita, Kansas. In July 2012 Bombardier Aerospace announced a temporary "production pause" of the latest variant Learjet 60XR to begin in the fourth quarter of 2012.

Development

The Learjet 60 is an improved version of the Learjet 55, with a longer fuselage and more powerful turbofan engines. It first flew on 10 October 1990 and received FAA certification in January 1993.

The modifications that converted the Learjet Model 55 into a Model 60 resulted from an aerodynamics improvement program and a need to increase the capacity of the Learjet product line. Several of these modifications were a first for Learjet, including an all-new inboard wing cuff added to the inboard sections of the “Longhorn” wing and an all-new wing-to-body fairing. By increasing the wing chord and the leading edge droop, the wing cuff improved handling during approach and landing, while the wing-to-body fairing reduced the interference drag between the wing and the fuselage. Since the engines were new for this aircraft, a new engine pylon had to be designed.

The lines of the cockpit have not changed but the fuselage was lengthened. In addition, the blend between the fuselage and the empennage was all new. While it appears as if area ruling was the intention of the blending, the blend design was really driven by attaching the original Learjet Model 35 empennage onto the larger Learjet Model 60 fuselage.

The final aerodynamic improvements to the Model 60 included the creation of the distinctive "ogive" winglet trailing edge. This lengthening of the chord near the interface of the winglet and the wing improved the interaction of the wing's pressure spike with the winglet's pressure spike. The result was a significant lowering of the drag in this area and a significant improvement of the wing's efficiency. On the prior “Longhorn” wing the interference between the winglet and the wing nearly canceled the effects of the winglet. The single ventral fin was also replaced with two ventral fins that Learjet called "Delta Fins" to improve stall characteristics and promote aerodynamic stability.

The Learjet 60 is notable for its time-to-climb performance, climbing to 41,000 feet (12,497 m) in 18.5 minutes at maximum weight. It also distinguished as the last legacy Learjet, using a variation of the wing that designer Bill Lear adapted from the Swiss military aircraft, the FFA P-16. The next-generation Learjet was to be the Learjet 85 and was an all-new design by Bombardier Aerospace slated for delivery in 2013.

The Learjet 60, while a tremendous performer, also maintains the highest incident/accident rate in its class with most accidents occurring during landing.  The use of the original Lear 23 gear and wheels (albeit it with an added brake rotor, bringing the total to 3 per wheel assembly) left the 60 (and the 55 before it) notably under-geared and under-braked.  According to the NTSB most of these failures are caused by pilot-error as the aircraft can be unforgiving.

Production of the Learjet 60 ended in 2007 after 318 aircraft had been built. The Learjet 60XR was a variation with upgraded Proline 21 avionics and slight improvements to the cabin, with production beginning at serial number 319.

By 2018, a Learjet 60 could be purchased for $1 million or less.

Learjet 60XR

Bombardier launched a new variant in 2005 designated the Learjet 60XR and following certification deliveries started in 2007.

Grandfathered on the 1966 Learjet 24 type certificate,
it was built until 2013.
It features three-rotor disc brakes, good for 450–600 landings, Rockwell Collins Pro Line 21 avionics, upgraded AHRS and FMS, electronic charts, enhanced MFD and optional XM radio weather.
Cabin space is better utilized with five floor plans, LED lighting, better insulation and improved cabin management system.
The 60XR has the largest Learjet cabin, its cross-section is competitive but its length is  shorter than other mid-size jets like the Hawker 800XP.
The small  wing evolved from the Learjet 23, with the tip tanks replaced by winglets, and runway requirements are long for the  aircraft.

It climbs to FL 410 in 18 min and cruise at  TAS with an average fuel burn of /h.
Long-range cruise varies from  TAS at FL 350–430 and ISA conditions, while normal cruise speed is Mach 0.76 or  TAS.

The FADEC-controlled  PW305A turbofans have a 6,000 h TBO and reserves amount to $360 per hour per engine.

In September 2018, there were 112 Model 60XRs in service, priced between $2.5 million for a 2007 model to $4.0 million for a 2013 one.

Operators

Civilian
The Learjet 60 is used by private operators, companies and fractional jet operators.

Military and government

Incidents and accidents
 On September 19, 2008, a Learjet 60 crashed while taking off from Columbia Metropolitan Airport in Columbia, South Carolina. Performers Travis Barker and DJ AM were injured, while both crew members and two other passengers were killed in the crash. 
NTSB identified "greatly underinflated tires" and "rejected takeoff after V1" as probable causes for the crash; it was exacerbated by a tire breaking a microswitch which caused reverse thrust to become a forward thrust. After the post-accident investigation, the Federal Aviation Administration issued new directives for operators of the Learjet 60 and 60XR aircraft to check tire pressures every four days.

Specifications

See also

References

Further reading 
 Taylor, Michael J.H. Brassey's World Aircraft & Systems Directory 1999/2000. London:Brassey's, 1999. .

External links

 Bombardier Learjet website

60
1990s United States business aircraft
Twinjets
Low-wing aircraft
T-tail aircraft
Aircraft first flown in 1993